The 2007 Barbarians rugby union tour  was a series of matches played in May 2007 in by Barbarians F.C. They played for the first time against Spain and Georgia.

Results

The squad  

 Coach: Zinzan Brooke

Half-back
 Matt Cornwell  – Leicester Tigers
 Guy Easterby  – Leinster
 Tyrone Howe  – Banbridge RFC
 Garry Law  – Border Reivers
 Kevin Maggs  – Ulster
 Nick Macleod  – Cardiff Blues
 Stuart Moffat  – Border Reivers
 Lee Robinson  – Bristol
 Nicky Robinson  – Cardiff Blues 
 Clive Stuart-Smith  – Llanelli Scarlets 
 Rhys Williams  – Cardiff Blues

Forwards 
 Andy Dalgleish  – Oxford univ.
 John Davies  – Cardiff Blues 
 Justin Fitzpatrick  – Ulster
 Jason Forster  Doncaster Knights
 Cai Griffiths  – Ospreys
 Jonathan Mills  – London Welsh
 James Hayter  – Harlequin F.C.
 Ollie Hodge  – Exeter RFC
Craig Hammond  – Nottingham R.F.C.
 Tom Jonhson  – Coventry R.F.C.
 Hottie Louw  – Bath
 Simon Miall  – Harlequin F.C.
 Hugh Vyvyan (capt.)   – Saracens
 Dorian Williams  – London Welsh

2007 rugby union tours
2007
2006–07 in British rugby union
2006–07 in Spanish rugby union
rugby union